Best Ink is an American reality competition series on Oxygen that judges tattoo artists. The series ran for three seasons, the first in 2012, the second in 2013, and the third in 2013-2014. The show was hosted by Kimberly Caldwell during Season 1 and by Pete Wentz in Seasons 2 and 3.

Best Ink premiered on March 27, 2012. The second season debuted on April 3, 2013. The third season debuted on December 4, 2013.

Cast
 Pete Wentz — Host (seasons 2–3)
 Kimberly Caldwell — Host (season 1)
 Joe Capobianco — Judge
 Sabina Kelley — Judge
 Hannah Aitchison — Judge

Format
A group of tattoo artists from around the United States compete in various tattooing challenges. The winner of the competition wins a $100,000 cash prize and a cover article in a well-known tattoo-related magazine. After each challenge, tattoo artist and the shows judges, along with different guest judge every week, critique the tattoos to find the contestant with the "Best Ink".

Flash challenge
Typically a non-tattooing task that tests the contestants' artistic skills using different media, subjects and "canvases." Usually the skills tested in the Flash Challenge will be a compulsory judging factor in the Elimination Tattoo.

Elimination tattoo
This stage starts with the winner of the Flash Challenge getting a privilege in this second stage. These perks can be first/only choice of which "skin" (client) they would like to tattoo or extra time, but is predetermined by the shows production team. Once each "Skin" is allocated to a contestant, a consultation period between artist and "skin" is given (typically in a set amount of time) and followed by chance to create the artwork overnight before tattooing the next day. The Elimination tattoos are performed simultaneously by all contestants and within a set amount of time. The judges then critique the work, choosing the best and worst tattoos of the week. The contestant that produces the worst tattoo is eliminated from the show until the final episode where one tattoo artist is judged the winner.

Contestants

Season 1
  Alexis Kovacs
  Christina "Charlie" Petty
  Jessica Rotwein
  Jon Mesa
  Kyle Giffen
  Brittan "London" Reese
  Meghan Pagliaroni
  Nicky Hennerez
  Roman Abrego
  Tiffany Perez

Season 2
  Alli Baker
  Brittany Elliott
  Carolyn
  Derek Rubright
  DJ Tambe
  Jerod Ray
  Jordan "Dollarz" Ginsberg
  Kelly McEvoy
  Melvin Todd
  Ralph Giordano
  Teresa Sharpe
  Tylor Schwarz

Season 3
 Alayna Magnan
 Amy Zager
 Anthony Zamora
 Carey Matthews
 Danny Lepore
 Darnell Waine
 Izzi Echo
 Joseph Matisa
 Karly Cleary
 Amy "May May" Yaeger
 Romeo Lacoste
 Rudy Hetzer
 Willy Cutlip
 Lara Slater

Contestant progress

Season 1

 (WINNER) The contestant won Best Ink.
 (RUNNER-UP) The contestant was the Runner-Up.
 (3RD PLACE) The contestant was in 3rd Place.
 (WIN) The contestant won best tattoo of the week.
 (HIGH) The contestant had one of the best tattoos of the week, but did not win.
 (IN) The contestant was safe.
 (LOW) The contestant had one of the best tattoos of the week, but was voted into the bottom.
 (LOW) The contestant had one of the worst tattoos of the week, but was the first to be called safe.
 (BTM2) The contestant had one of the worst tattoos of the week and was the last to be called safe.
 (OUT) The contestant was eliminated from the competition.

Season 2

Bold The contestant won immunity the previous week and was automatically safe the preceding week.
 (WINNER) The contestant won Best Ink.
 (RUNNER-UP) The contestant was the runner-up.
 (3RD PLACE) The contestant was in 3rd Place.
 (WIN) The contestant won best tattoo of the week, and received automatic immunity for the next week's Ink Challenge.
 (WIN) The contestant won best tattoo of the week, but did not receive automatic immunity for the next week's Ink Challenge.
 (HIGH) The contestant had one of the best tattoos of the week, but did not win.
 (IN) The contestant was safe.
 (LOW) The contestant had one of the worst tattoos of the week, but was the first to be called safe.
 (BTM2) The contestant had one of the worst tattoos of the week and was the last to be called safe.
 (OUT) The contestant was eliminated from the competition.

Season 3

Bold The contestant won immunity the previous week and was automatically safe the preceding week.
 (WINNER) The contestant won Best Ink.
 (RUNNER-UP) The contestant was the runner-up.
 (3RD PLACE) The contestant was in 3rd Place.
 (WIN) The contestant won best tattoo of the week, and received automatic immunity for the next week's Ink Challenge.
 (WIN) The contestant won best tattoo of the week, but did not receive automatic immunity for the next week's Ink Challenge.
 (HIGH) The contestant had one of the best tattoos of the week, but did not win.
 (IN) The contestant was safe.
 (LOW) The contestant had one of the worst tattoos of the week, but was the first to be called safe.
 (BTM2) The contestant had one of the worst tattoos of the week and was the last to be called safe.
 (OUT) The contestant was eliminated from the competition.

 : Joe was originally supposed to be in the bottom 3, but since he had won the Ink Challenge the previous week he was automatically safe.

Episodes

Series overview

Season 1 (2012)

Season 2 (2013)

Season 3 (2013–14)

See also
List of tattoo TV shows

References

2010s American reality television series
2012 American television series debuts
2014 American television series endings
English-language television shows
Oxygen (TV channel) original programming
Tattooing television series